Ágúst Friðrik Hauksson (born 11 September 1960) is an Icelandic former footballer who played as a defender. He won one cap for the Iceland national football team. Ágúst made his only appearance for his country in the 4–1 win against Greenland, coming on as a substitute for Trausti Haraldsson.

References
 

1960 births
Living people
Agust Hauksson
Association football defenders
Agust Hauksson
Agust Hauksson
Agust Hauksson
Agust Hauksson